Andy Curran may refer to:

 Andy Curran (footballer) (1898–?), English footballer
 Andy Curran (musician), Canadian rock musician